Lone Peak High School (LPHS) is a public high school in Highland, Utah, United States. Part of the Alpine School District, in northern Utah County, it was built in 1997 to serve students in the cities of Alpine, Highland, and Cedar Hills. Lone Peak High School was given athletic 5A status beginning at the 2005-2006 school year. However, it has since been given a 6A status. The school mascot is a knight.

Academics
Lone Peak offers several honors classes and AP courses, as well as off-campus classes at nearby colleges such as Brigham Young University, University of Utah, Utah Valley University, and business and technical colleges.

Athletics
Lone Peak sponsors several interscholastic teams for both boys and girls: basketball, cross country, soccer, swimming, tennis, golf, and track and field. For boys there are teams competing in baseball, football, and wrestling. Girls may also compete in cheerleading, drill team, softball, and volleyball.

State championships
Teams that have won state championships sponsored by the Utah High School Activities Association:
Basketball (boys): 2001, 2007, 2008, 2011, 2012, 2013, 2014, 2018
 Football: 2011, 2018, 2021
 Soccer (boys): 2005
 Swimming (girls): 1998, 1999, 2001, 2002, 2005
 Track & field (girls): 1999, 2000
 Golf (girls): 2016
 Tennis (girls): 2011, 2012, 2014, 2015, 2017
Volleyball (girls): 2010, 2016, 2017, 2018

The 2013 boys' basketball team was ranked as the top team in the nation by numerous ranking systems including USA Today and MaxPreps, thus crowning them national champions. Lone Peak's biggest rivals are American Fork High School and Skyridge High School.

Notable alumni

 C. J. Ah You - NFL defensive end, defensive tackle
 Nikki Bohne - Broadway actress, singer, and dancer
 Jackson Emery - Utah's Mr. Basketball 2005; former BYU basketball player and All-Time MWC steals leader
 Justin Hamilton - professional basketball center
 Jacob Hannemann - Professional baseball player
 Tyler Haws - Utah's Mr. Basketball 2008 and 2009; BYU basketball player
 Frank Jackson - basketball point guard for the Detroit Pistons
 Eric Mika - Professional basketball player
 Shawn Murphy - NFL offensive guard
 Kiersten White - author of young adult paranormal romance
 Seth Corry - Professional Baseball player
 Calvin Whiting - Major League Rugby player for the Utah Warriors
 Chase Hansen - Utah’s Mr. Football 2011; NFL Linebacker

See also
 List of high schools in Utah
 Ava Ward
 Bob Ross
 Brandon Johnson
 Gunnar Bolen
 Landon Cemer

References

External links

 

Public high schools in Utah
Educational institutions established in 1997
Schools in Utah County, Utah
1997 establishments in Utah